Canadian Independent School District is a public school district based in Canadian, Texas, United States.

In addition to Hemphill County, where it serves Canadian and Glazier; it includes a section of Lipscomb County, where it serves Higgins.

In 2009, the school district was rated "academically acceptable" by the Texas Education Agency.

Ken King, a former president of the CISD, is now the Texas state representative from District 88, which encompasses a large swath of the Panhandle and the South Plains, including Canadian and Hemphill County. The current president and vice-president of the trustees are Larry Gatlin and Courtney Trollinger, respectively.

Canadian futures trader and hedge fund operator Salem Abraham is a former trustee and board president.

The Canadian Boys Football and Basketball teams won the State Championships during the 2014-2015 school year. They repeated that feat during the 2015-2016 school year. Canadian ISD is the very first school in UIL history to win Back to Back titles in both Football and Basketball in consecutive years.

History

In 1951 the Baker School Annex, which has seven classrooms and had a cost of $90,000, opened.

Woodie E. Beene served as superintendent until he resigned in 1966 so he could become superintendent of Stamford ISD. Joe R. Cullender succeeded him as superintendent; Cullender was previously principal of the high school.

On July 1, 2020 Higgins Independent School District consolidated into Canadian ISD. CISD superintendent Lynn Pulliam stated that he expected the enrollment of Canadian ISD schools to increase by 35, based upon the overall population of the town of Higgins.

Schools
Canadian High (Grades 9-12)
Canadian Middle (Grades 6-8)
Baker Elementary (Grades 3-5)
Canadian Elementary (Grades PK-2)

References

External links
Canadian ISD

School districts in Hemphill County, Texas
School districts in Lipscomb County, Texas